Róbert Valíček (born March 10, 1969 in Martin, Žilina Region) is a retired male race walker from Slovakia. He set his personal best (1:20.58) in the men's 20 km event on April 19, 1997 in Poděbrady, Czech Republic.

Achievements

References

sports-reference

1969 births
Living people
Slovak male racewalkers
Athletes (track and field) at the 1996 Summer Olympics
Athletes (track and field) at the 2000 Summer Olympics
Olympic athletes of Slovakia
Sportspeople from Martin, Slovakia